

Peerage of England 

|Earl of Northampton (1080)||Simon Saint-Lis, 3rd Earl of Northampton||1153||1184|| 
|-
|Earl of Surrey (1088)||Isabel de Warenne, 4th Countess of Surrey||1148||1199|| 
|-
|Earl of Warwick (1088)||William de Beaumont, 3rd Earl of Warwick||1153||1184|| 
|-
|Earl of Devon (1141)||Baldwin de Redvers, 3rd Earl of Devon||1162||1188|| 
|-
|Earl of Leicester (1107)||Robert de Beaumont, 3rd Earl of Leicester||1168||1190|| 
|-
|Earl of Chester (1121)||Hugh de Kevelioc, 3rd Earl of Chester||1153||1181|| 
|-
|Earl of Gloucester (1121)||William Fitzrobert, 2nd Earl of Gloucester||1147||1183|| 
|-
|rowspan=2|Earl of Hertford (1135)||Roger de Clare, 3rd Earl of Hertford||1151||1173||Died
|-
|Richard de Clare, 4th Earl of Hertford||1173||1217|| 
|-
|rowspan=2|Earl of Richmond (1136)||Conan IV, Duke of Brittany||1146||1171||Died
|-
|Constance of Brittany||1171||1201|| 
|-
|rowspan=2|Earl of Arundel (1138)||William d'Aubigny, 1st Earl of Arundel||1138||1176||Died
|-
|William d'Aubigny, 2nd Earl of Arundel||1176||1193|| 
|-
|Earl of Derby (1138)||William de Ferrers, 3rd Earl of Derby||1162||1190|| 
|-
|rowspan=2|Earl of Pembroke (1138)||Richard de Clare, 2nd Earl of Pembroke||1147||1176||Died
|-
|Gilbert de Strigul, 3rd Earl of Pembroke||1176||1185|| 
|-
|Earl of Essex (1139)||William de Mandeville, 3rd Earl of Essex||1160||1189|| 
|-
|rowspan=2|Earl of Norfolk (1140)||Hugh Bigod, 1st Earl of Norfolk||1140||1177||Died
|-
|Roger Bigod, 2nd Earl of Norfolk||1177||1221|| 
|-
|Earl of Cornwall (1141)||Reginald de Dunstanville, 1st Earl of Cornwall||1141||1175||Died
|-
|Earl of Oxford (1142)||Aubrey de Vere, 1st Earl of Oxford||1142||1194|| 
|-
|Earl of Salisbury (1145)||William of Salisbury, 2nd Earl of Salisbury||1168||1196|| 
|-
|Earl of Buckingham (1164)||Richard de Clare, 2nd Earl of Pembroke||1164||1176||Died

Peerage of Scotland

|rowspan=2|Earl of Mar (1114)||Morggán, Earl of Mar||Abt. 1140||Abt. 1178||Died
|-
|Gille Críst, Earl of Mar||Abt. 1178||Abt. 1220||
|-
|Earl of Dunbar (1115)||Waltheof, Earl of Dunbar||1166||1182||
|-
|Earl of Angus (1115)||Gille Brigte, Earl of Angus||1135||1187||
|-
|Earl of Atholl (1115)||Máel Coluim, Earl of Atholl||Abt 1150||Abt 1190||
|-
|Earl of Buchan (1115)||Colbán, Earl of Buchan||Abt. 1135||Abt. 1180||
|-
|rowspan=2|Earl of Strathearn (1115)||Ferchar, Earl of Strathearn||Abt. 1140||1171||Died
|-
|Gille Brigte, Earl of Strathearn||1171||1223||
|-
|Earl of Fife (1129)||Donnchad II, Earl of Fife||1154||1203||
|-
|Earl of Menteith (1160)||Gille Críst, Earl of Menteith||Abt. 1160||Abt. 1190||
|-
|}

Peerage of Ireland

|Baron Athenry (1172)||Robert de Bermingham||1172||1218||New creation
|-
|}

References

 

Lists of peers by decade
1170s in England
12th century in Ireland
12th century in Scotland
12th-century English people
12th-century mormaers
Peers